Caroline Heron (born 3 November 1990) is a Scottish footballer who plays as forward for Heart of Midlothian in the SWPL 2, and former cricketer. She previously played for Forfar Farmington and Hibernian.

Football career

College career
Heron joined the AIC Yellow Jackets in 2010. She scored her first collegiate goal in a victory against Bridgeport on 2 September 2010. She scored eight goals and added two assists in 13 appearances as a freshman, before suffering a season-ending injury in a win over Stonehill. In October 2010, she was selected to the Northeast-10 All-Conference Third-Team and All-Rookie team, and named Northeast-10 Rookie of the Year. The following year, she made 8 appearances and recorded one assist, but she was unable to finish the season due to an injury.

Club career
Heron joined SWPL 2 side Heart of Midlothian in 2019. She made her debut as a substitute against Hamilton Academical on 10 February 2019, and she made her first start a week later, scoring twice in a 9–0 win over Hutchison Vale.

Cricket career 

Heron was initially named in the Scottish squad for the 2008 Women's Cricket World Cup Qualifier, but she withdrew due to an injury and was replaced by Paula Ritchie.

Honours

Club
Hibernian
 Scottish Women's Cup: 2016
 Scottish Women's Premier League Cup: 2017

Individual

Club
 Forfar Farmington Goal of the Season: 2018

References

External links 

 Carolien Heron at American International College Yellow Jackets
 Caroline Heron at Soccerway

1990 births
Living people
Scottish women cricketers
Scottish women's footballers
Hibernian W.F.C. players
Scottish Women's Premier League players
Women's association football forwards
American International Yellow Jackets women's soccer players
Scottish expatriate women's footballers
Expatriate women's soccer players in the United States
Scottish expatriate sportspeople in the United States